Live Demonstration is a demo tape made by British rock band Oasis in 1993, prior to their rise to fame. The tape helped secure a recording contract with Creation Records, with most of the tracks ending up on the band's first batch of releases, including their debut album, Definitely Maybe.

The Live Demonstration cassette was reissued in a limited amount on 12 April 2014 for the 20th anniversary of Definitely Maybe. The reissue appears almost identical to the original, down to the handwritten cassette label, Union Jack artwork, and Noel Gallagher's 1993 contact information; the notable differences are that the reissued spine says "Oasis" whereas the original says "Oasis Live", the copyright marking "Ⓟ & © 1993 Big Brother Recordings Ltd" on the cassette itself, and liner notes written by Mark Coyle on the inside of the J-card.

Overview
In 1992, Oasis were an up-and-coming live act in Manchester, with a small following, but no signs of a record contract. Realising their potential, Oasis guitarist and songwriter Noel Gallagher contacted Tony Griffiths of the Liverpool band The Real People. The two had met on a North American tour with the Inspiral Carpets, on which The Real People had been the opening act and Gallagher had worked as a roadie. Gallagher asked him if Oasis could use their studio to produce a professional sounding demo which they could then send to record companies. Griffiths and his brother Chris claim to have taught the band a lot about recording songs during that period.  Around a dozen songs were recorded at the studio at Dock Road, Liverpool in Spring 1993, of which six songs ended up on the final demo tape.  The versions of "D'Yer Wanna Be A Spaceman?" and "Married With Children" were recorded at the home of co-producer Mark Coyle.

It is estimated that 10 cassette copies were sent out with a J-card insert depicting a swirling Union Jack and the now famous Oasis logo designed by Tony French.  More cassettes were handed out without the picture sleeve, but with instead, a handwritten set of notes.

In May 1993, the band were invited to play a gig at the famous Glasgow nightclub King Tut's, by a band who shared their rehearsal rooms. Oasis found the money to hire a van and make the six-hour journey to Glasgow.  Among the people at the club that night was head of Creation Records, Alan McGee, who knew some of the other acts playing.  Upon seeing Oasis for the first time, he was apparently so impressed that after the show, he went up to the band and offered them a record deal on the spot.  A copy of the demo tape was handed to McGee that night, of which the contents made McGee even more determined to sign up the band.  A couple of months later, Oasis signed a 6-album deal with Creation Records.

As Oasis' fame grew in the 1990s the tape soon became an item desired by collectors and copies started changing hands for hundreds of pounds. In the 2016 edition of "Rare Record Price Guide" published by Record Collector, an advertisement by Omega Auctions (on page 1) states a copy has since been sold for more than £6,000.

The strength of the tracks on Live Demonstration was proved by the fact that four of the songs eventually ended up on Definitely Maybe; ("Married with Children", "Rock 'N' Roll Star", "Bring It on Down" and "Columbia"), with three others appearing as B-sides ("D'Yer Wanna Be a Spaceman?", "Fade Away" and "Cloudburst").  The other song, "Strange Thing", saw its first commercial release in May 2014, with the release of the 20th anniversary edition of Definitely Maybe.

Track listing

All songs were written by Noel Gallagher.
Side one
"Cloudburst"
"Columbia" 
"D'yer Wanna Be a Spaceman?"
"Strange Thing"

Side two
"Bring It on Down"
"Married with Children"
"Fade Away"
"Rock 'n' Roll Star"

Official releases
"Cloudburst" – Released as a B-side on the "Live Forever" single
"Fade Away" – Released as a B-side on the "Cigarettes & Alcohol" single, and later on The Masterplan album
"Columbia" – An edited version of the demo was released on a white label promo 12" in December 1993. As a result, this became the first Oasis song played on BBC Radio 1, adding to the growing buzz surrounding the band. This version was also released as a B-side on the "Supersonic" single, as well as on Oasis' debut album Definitely Maybe
"D'Yer Wanna Be a Spaceman?" – Released as a B-side on the "Shakermaker" single
"Married with Children" – Released on Oasis' debut album, Definitely Maybe
"Bring It on Down" – Released on Oasis' debut album, Definitely Maybe
"Rock 'n' Roll Star" – Released on Oasis' debut album, Definitely Maybe
"Strange Thing" – Released on the 2014 remaster of Definitely Maybe

References

Oasis (band) albums
1993 albums
Demo albums
Self-released albums
Albums produced by Mark Coyle